Zargari also known as Zargar is a village in Ghazni Province, Afghanistan. The official language in the province of Zargar is Zubani Zargari, which is interconnected with Dari.

See also 
 Ghazni Province

References 

Populated places in Ghazni Province
Villages in Afghanistan